Auchenipterichthys longimanus is a species of driftwood catfish endemic to Brazil where it is found in the Amazon River basin.  It grows to a length of 15 cm.

References 

 

Auchenipteridae
Fish described in 1864
Taxa named by Albert Günther
Endemic fauna of Brazil